SS Santa Catalina may refer to:

 , acquired by the United States Navy during World War I and renamed USS Black Hawk; served as a destroyer tender through the end of World War II; sold in 1947

Ship names